Asura aurantiaca is a moth of the  family Erebidae. It is found in India.

References

aurantiaca
Moths described in 1878
Moths of Asia